Parodianthus is a genus of flowering plants belonging to the family Verbenaceae.

Its native range is northern Argentina.

The genus name of Parodianthus is in honour of Lorenzo Raimundo Parodi (1895–1966), an Argentinian botanist and agricultural engineer, professor of botany in Buenos Aires and La Plata with a focus on South American grasses. It was first described and published in Darwiniana Vol.5 on page 37 in 1941.

Known species
According to Kew:
Parodianthus capillaris 
Parodianthus ilicifolius

References

Verbenaceae
Verbenaceae genera
Plants described in 1941
Flora of Northeast Argentina
Flora of Northwest Argentina